Mentasta can refer to:

 Ahtna people of Alaska
 Mentasta Mountains, Alaska
 Mentasta Pass, Mentasta Mountains